The SGroup - Universities in Europe network (SGroup), previously called Santander, is a non-profit association of universities incorporated in Spain. It was founded in 1992.

Members 

Armenia
 Yerevan State Medical University - Associate Member

Australia
 La Trobe University

Belgium
 Ghent University
 University of Liège

Bosnia and Herzegovina
 University of Sarajevo

China
 Shanghai International Studies University - Associate Member

Colombia
 University of Los Andes - Associate Member

Croatia
 University of Split

Cyprus
 University of Cyprus

Czech Republic
 University of Ostrava

Finland
 Tampere University

France
 Université Grenoble Alpes
 University of Le Havre
 University of Lille
 University of Rouen

Germany
 Justus Liebig University in Giessen
 University of Bayreuth

Greece
 University of Patras

Hungary
 University of Szeged

Italy
 Sapienza University of Rome
 University of Catania
 University of Messina
 University of Trieste

Malta
 University of Malta

Netherlands
 Eindhoven University of Technology

Norway
 NTNU Trondheim

Poland
 Adam Mickiewicz University in Poznań
 Silesian University of Technology
 University of Szczecin

Portugal
 University of Minho
 University of Porto

Romania
 Babeş-Bolyai University

Spain
 Polytechnic University of Valencia
 Rovira i Virgili University
 University of Cantabria
 University of Las Palmas de Gran Canaria
 University of León
 University of Valladolid

Sweden
 Malmö University
 University of Gothenburg

United Kingdom
 University of Kent
 University of Westminster

References

External links
 

College and university associations and consortia in Europe
Organizations established in 1992
Organisations based in Porto